Daruma Rock is a rock on the coast at the west side of Nishi-naga-iwa Glacier in Queen Maud Land. It was mapped from surveys and air photos by the Japanese Antarctic Research Expedition, 1957–62, and named "Daruma-iwa" (tumbler rock).

References
 

Rock formations of Queen Maud Land
Prince Olav Coast